The  is an event held typically (but not necessarily) on the second Monday of January (Coming of Age Day) to congratulate and encourage those who will become adults during the school year, mainly by local governments in Japan. During the Ceremony, guest speakers give lectures, and commemorative gifts are presented. It is not sponsored by the Japanese government but by each municipality independently. Therefore, although the school-age system, which determines the eligibility for participation, is the same everywhere, some municipalities hold the event on days other than the Coming of Age Day. The age of adulthood was lowered from 20 to 18 on April 1, 2022. However, some municipalities continue to set the age eligible for participating in the Ceremony at 20, while others have lowered it to 18.

Origin 
Rituals to celebrate adulthood have existed since ancient times, such as Genpuku (changing to adult clothing) and Fundoshi Iwai (loincloth celebration) for boys and Mogi (dressing up) and Keppatsu (tying the hair up) for girls. Cultural anthropology and folklore studies treat such ceremonies as rites of passage (initiations).

Today’s form of the Japanese Coming of Age Ceremony has roots from the Youth Festival held in Warabi Town (currently Warabi City), Kitaadachi County, Saitama Prefecture on November 22, 1946, shortly after Japan’s defeat in World War II. At the time, when Japan was in a state of despair due to the defeat, Shojiro Takahashi, then the leader of the Youth League of Warabi Town (later the mayor of Warabi City), hosted a youth festival in order to give hope and encouragement to the young people who would bear Japan's future. The festival was held in a tent on the school grounds of Warabi First Elementary School (currently North Warabi Elementary School), which included the Adulthood Ceremony. This ceremony spread throughout the country and became the present Coming of Age Ceremony.

In Warabi City, it is still called the Adulthood Ceremony. On the Coming of Age Day in 1979, the city erected a monument to mark the birthplace of the Coming of Age Ceremony in Warabi Castle Site Park and commemorated the 20th anniversary of the promotion to a city and the 30th anniversary of the establishment of Coming of Age Day.

Inspired by Warabi’s youth festival, the Japanese government promulgated and enacted the National Holidays Law in 1948. In 1949, January 15 was designated as the Coming of Age Day to congratulate and exhort young people to become adults and live independently. Since then, the Coming of Age Ceremony has been held on this day in most regions of Japan. Later, with the 1998 revision of the National Holidays Law, the Coming of Age Day was moved to the second Monday of January in 2000. This amendment is called the “Happy Monday System” because it makes a long weekend (Saturday – Monday). In addition, according to a survey conducted around 2018, Nagoya City and Morotsuka Village in the Higashiusuki District, Miyazaki Prefecture also claim to be the birthplace of the Coming of Age Ceremony.

The date 
The Ceremony is commonly held on the Coming of Age Day, but there are regional variations. Some municipalities hold it during Golden Week (a week from late April to early May when Japanese holidays follow one after another), Obon (days to honor one's ancestors), or January 1–3. For example, in Niigata prefecture in 2017, no city held it on the Coming of Age Day (January 8); two were on January 7, and all others were during March, April, May, or August. It is because these areas have high snowfall, and many young people are out of town and do not come back until Golden Week or Obon. Many ceremonies were canceled or postponed in 1988 due to the death of the Emperor, and in 2020 due to the Corona pandemic.

The eligibility 
Initially, eligible people to participate in the Coming of Age Ceremony were those with birthdays between the day after the Coming of Age Day of the previous year and that of the current year. So for the Ceremony held on January 15, 1999, participants must have been born after January 15, 1980 (19 years ago), until January 14, 1981 (18 years ago). However, recently (especially since the introduction of the Happy Monday System), the school-age system has become more common. In the Japanese school system, a grade consists of students born between April 2 of a year and April 1 of the subsequent year. Today, those who legally become adults between April of the previous year and March of the current year are eligible to participate in the ceremony.

This new practice caused a problem. If the eligibility for the Coming of Age Ceremony is based on the school age, those born after the Coming of Age Day and before April 2 must attend the Ceremony a year later than their peers. Consequently, they can find fewer friends to celebrate with at the Ceremony.

Due to the Happy Monday system, there were some people who were still 19 years old at the Coming of Age Ceremony for the year, but they would become 21 years old at the Ceremony of the following year. For example, as shown in the January 2001 calendar, a person born on the second Monday, January 12, 1981 was still 19 years old on the Coming of Age Day (January 8, 2001), but the same person became 21 years old on the Day in 2002. The same problem occurred for those born between January 10–13 in 1992 and January 9–13 in 1998.

Additionally, in Sapporo City, Hokkaido and Hiroshima City, Hiroshima Prefecture, the calendar year system was used in which those who reached their 20th birthday between January 1 and December 31 of the past year were eligible to participate in the Coming of Age Ceremony. This system has been switched to the school-age system since 2000, however.

Until the 1960s, more than half of the new adults were working youths who had already entered society. However, since the 1970s, the number of students entering universities and vocational schools has increased, while the number of junior high school and high school graduates finding employment has decreased. Consequently, the ratio of students (rather than working youth) to all new adults has been increasing year by year.

The Statistics Bureau of the Ministry of Internal Affairs and Communications estimated the population of new adults in January 2020 to be 1.22 million. Its percentage in comparison to the total population had been below 1% for 10 consecutive years. The participation of people from other countries, such as technical intern trainees and international students, has also been increasing. In 2020, Shiogama City, Miyagi Prefecture sent out invitations in Indonesian, Vietnamese, English, and Easy Japanese. The city had 30 foreign-born participants in 2019, about 6% of the total participating adults.

Problems 
According to the public opinion survey conducted by the Yokohama City Board of Education in March 2004, among minors, new adults, and people in their 20s, approximately 20% to 30% viewed the Coming of Age Ceremony as an event like a reunion where friends meet again. Furthermore, 20% of the women in their 20s or younger responded that the Ceremony is an event where new adults meet in formal suits and festive clothes. This result suggests that the event’s purpose and the target group’s expectations are divergent.

In this survey, 82.7% of high school students and minors said that they wanted to participate in the Ceremony, while 17.2% said they did not. Among high school students and minors, the most common reason for not participating was “not interested in the content,” at 36.8%. While more than 50% of high school students, minors, and new adults answered that attractions such as concerts by singers were necessary, half of them also answered that introductions of guests such as mayors and politicians were unnecessary. The Yokohama City’s proposal determines that such components make the Ceremony lengthy and impoverish the content.

Coming of Age Ceremony business 
In recent years, fewer Japanese people have worn kimonos. Since many participants wear expensive kimonos for the Ceremony, the kimono industry promote kimonos. However, because kimonos are so expensive that many end up renting them or using those handed down from their mothers.

The Ceremony is also a good opportunity for the beauty industry, which dresses, makes up, and hairdos for the attendees. They host makeup workshops for those who begin wearing makeup earnestly and sell cosmetic products. Even photo studios, where attendees take commemorative pictures after being decorously dressed, will focus on advertising. Competition for customers has become zealous in related businesses.

In 2018, Harenohi, a company that sells furisode (long-sleeved kimono) in Yokohama and other cities, abruptly shut down its business on January 8, the Coming of Age Ceremony day. This incident caused an uproar because those who had made reservations to purchase or rent a furisode from the company were unable to wear it, and some had to cancel their participation in the Ceremony.

References 

:Category:Wikipedia Student Program

Adolescence in Asia